Glossarion is a genus of South American flowering plants in the family Asteraceae.

 Species
 Glossarion bilabiatum (Maguire) Pruski  - Amazonas State in Venezuela and Amazonas State in Brazil
 Glossarion rhodanthum Maguire & Wurdack - Amazonas State in Venezuela and Amazonas State in Brazil

References

Asteraceae genera
Flora of the Amazon
Stifftioideae